Epsilon Coronae Borealis, Latinized from ε Coronae Borealis, is a multiple star system in the constellation Corona Borealis located around 230 light-years from the Solar System. It shines with a combined apparent magnitude of 4.13, meaning it is visible to the unaided eye in all night skies except those brightly lit in inner city locations. It is an orange giant around 1.7 times as massive as the Sun of spectral type K2III, which has exhausted its core fuel supply of hydrogen and swollen to 21 times the Sun's diameter and 151 times its luminosity. That is, Epsilon Coronae Borealis's diameter is about one-quarter of Mercury's orbit. Its surface temperature has been calculated to be  4365 ± 9 K, or 4406 ± 15 K. It is thought to be around 1.74 billion years old.

Epsilon Coronae Borealis B is a companion star thought to be an orange dwarf of spectral types K3V to K9V that orbits at a distance of 135 astronomical units, completing one orbit every 900 years.

A faint (magnitude 11.5) star, 1.5 arc minutes away, has been called Epsilon Coronae Borealis C although it is only close by line of sight and is unrelated to the system.

The ε CrB star system's radial velocity was observed over seven years from January 2005 to January 2012, during which time a 'wobble' with a period of around 418 days was recorded. This has been calculated to be a planet around 6.7 times as massive as Jupiter orbiting at a distance of 1.3 astronomical units with an eccentricity of 0.11.

Epsilon Coronae Borealis lies one degree north of (and is used as a guide for) the variable T Coronae Borealis.

References

Corona Borealis
K-type giants
Coronae Borealis, Epsilon
Coronae Borealis, 12
078159
143107
5947
BD+27 2558
J15573523+2652400